Harry Butcher (March 23, 1894 — June 18, 1942) was an American racecar driver originally from Wilmington, Illinois.

Indy 500 results

References 

1894 births
1942 deaths
Indianapolis 500 drivers
People from Wilmington, Will County, Illinois
Racing drivers from Illinois